The Karajarri are an Aboriginal Australian people, who once lived south-west of the Kimberleys in the northern Pilbara region, predominantly between the coastal area and the Great Sandy Desert. They now mostly reside at Bidyadanga, south of Broome. To their north lived the Yawuru people, to the east the Mangala, to the northeast the Nyigina, and to their south the Nyangumarta. Further down the coast were the Kariera.

Language

The first description of the grammar of their language, Garadjeri, was published by Gerhardt Laves in 1931. It belongs to the Marngu branch of the Pama-Nyungan language family. The native conceptualisation of its varieties recognises 4 dialect forms, the Najanaja (or Murrkut) dialect spoken by coastal Karajarri, Nangu spoken in the central hinterlands and Nawurtu further east inland. Garadjeri has had a notable influence on the Yawuru language, many of whose terms for ceremonials, and for naming the indigenous flora and fauna, have been borrowed from the Karajarri. Less than 20 native speakers (2004) remain. Together with Nyangumarta, Karrajarri shows some features that are exceptional within the Kimberley Pama-Nyungan languages, in having bound pronominals affixed to inflecting verbs.

Country
Notable Karajarri sites marking their boundaries were at Lendjarkading, Redjarth, Undurmadatj and Mount Phire (Paijara).

Traditional social structure
The Karajarri were divided into two distinct groups, those who inhabited the coastal areas, called Naja (Nadja), and the inlanders dwelling on the eastern plains and bushlands, the Nawutu (Naudu). The social hierarchy was headed by ritual leaders (pirrka, literally 'roots of a tree'),
male elders who organised ceremonial life, and who are also responsible for management of the country and the general affairs of tribal members. Members of a Karajarri group were classified in four ways, panaka, purrungu, parrjari and karimpa, a tribal taxonomy that is determined by alternate generation levels distinguished along moiety lines called inara. Thus one inara, represented by the barn swallow (wiyurr), is panaka-purrungu, being constituted by self, grandparents, sisters, brothers, cousins and grandchildren, together with marriageable partners and their siblings, the other, karimpa-parrjarri, is inclusive of one's mother, father, aunts, uncles, great grandparents and grandchildren, and is emblemised in terms of the fork-tailed swift (kitirr). Both the kitirr and wiyurr  are viewed as heralds of rain.

Pukarri (dream) connote states of reality formed in the mythic Dreamtime when the landscape was created, and exercises a binding, inviolable force, the word being applied to institutional practices that are traced back to the primal order of things in a given tribal country (ngurrara). Marriage and kinship relationships are influenced by factors related to the implications that arise from their legends concerning the living waters.

Ecology
The area encompassed by Karajarri lands sits on the La Grange sub-basin, one of the richest groundwater areas in Western Australia, and a Pindan ecology, the pirra of the Karajarri inland, with stygofauna which has yet to be studied in any depth.

The Karajarri perceive their world (ngurrara (one's own country') in terms of a mythology that weaves seamlessly together all the features of the landscape, the language and customs, a nexus which was then reflected in ritual practices. The language itself, as is generally the case among indigenous cultures of Australia, is thought of in terms of particular stretches of country, and each form was first spoken by the Dreamtime being who wandered the land, speaking each tongue depending on the tract of land where its speakers came to dwell.

In the Karajarri conception, one shared by many other nations in the region, such as the Nyigina, Yawuru, Nyangumarta and Mangala, the land is understood as coming from the 'Dreaming' (pukarrikarra), of which they are the custodians. Given the scarcity of fresh water, what they call 'living water'(karnangkul), the Karajarri secured their resources by a system of wells, soaks (lirri) and springs throughout the wetlands. The management of the karnangkul is dictated by the need to respect and placate powerful serpentine beings (pulany/bulaing) in the waters. The concept may reflect, etymology suggests, a residue of the conception of a rainbow serpent, still attested in Arnhem Land lore (bolung). The word may be linked to the Arnhem land variant.)

There is a complex mythology concerning the living waters, focused on the spirits, pulany, dangerous or benign, that are thought to inhabit them, and are thought to be responsible for the seasonal replenishment of these water places (ngapa). Special ceremonies are undertaken to ensure that the water beings make rain. Camping is avoided in such sites. The presence of such water snakes is often attested by panyjin reeds, the whiskers of the pulany, which can travel underground to emerge from tulkarru holes.
There exists a Karajarri song to entice back into the waters the ancestral serpent if a spring dries up, in order to refresh the aquifer. It is transmitted for such an emergency, though circumstances have never changed to require its recitation.

The first whiteman's survey of the area, conducted by a party led by Frederick Kennedy Panter, commander of the schooner New Perseverance. After striking inland for 50 miles, Panter returned to report that the land was furnished with numerous native wells, thickly wooded and endowed with groves of cajeput eucalypts suitable for construction. Overall, Panter concluded the Karajarri lands offered '40,000 acres of splendidly grassed land,' while the natives were 'quiet' and 'friendly'. The area was one the Karajarri call pajalpi or 'spring country' given the richness of its spring waters and the lush growth of local plants there.

History of contact
The Karajarri developed a ceremonial rite (milyankurl) in order to govern the introduction of strangers into their midst, and to pacify the potential for danger in these encounters. They call non indigenous people walanyu (strangers from beyond), a concept that also embraces hostile spirits (wirangu) and other inland aboriginal people. It is thought that East Asian maritime sailors visited their region before the era of white exploration. Generally they would trade and barter with the Asian hired hands working the British pearling luggers, such as the Timorese, Chinese, Malays, Javanese and Japanese. In Karajarri practice, walanyu could drop their outsider status once if the recognized the pirrka, were properly introduced, and had exchanged gifts.

After Panter's report was circulated, the Roebuck Bay Pastoral Company was formed and a ship, the Nile, was commissioned in Freemantle to establish a presence in Karakarri territory, with company representatives and a contingent of police troopers. They set up a camp near Cape Vilaret and appropriated a local well, one of the few on the coast with fresh water. Hostilities broke out, as sorties to take over wells or cut timber were resisted. Attempts to drive them off were repelled for some months, causing the loss of life among some locals.

An expedition led by James Richard Harding (1838–1864), comprising Panter, William Henry Goldwyer (1829–1864) and three police troopers, set out to explore the pajalpi lands suitable for pastoral development south around La Grange Bay. Martin had reported a regular system of wells 3–4 m deep, at intervals of a mile, stretching inland from Roebuck and La Grange. The three intruders encountered native resistance and, in a day, in two incidents shot 3 Indigenous people then a further 15, as they defended their campsite at a small lake called Boolla Boolla, otherwise known to the Karajarri as Injitana, a Karajarri sacred ceremonial site. According to their traditional account, the expedition had desecrated a sacred site (jinjarlkuriny), a rainmaking
permanent water place (jila). The whitemen in turn were overrun and killed. The Nile left the area in January 1865 with the men still missing.

Stock routes in the 1880s such as those opened up by Nat Buchanan, who developed the de Grey-Kimberley stockroute, often followed aboriginal dreamtime contours and their sacred watering sites, and, as government inspectors noted, those who took up pastoral leases often then denied native peoples access to the wells on their stations. Eventually the Karajarri and other regional tribes, esp. after the Aborigines Act (1905), were taken on as indentured labour, their local knowledge of the waterways and lay of the land being of great use to the pastoralists.

In the 1930s the anthropologists Ralph Piddington and A. P. Elkin surveyed the water soaks and wells, and their function within Karajarri thought and life.

Native title and development

Following the landmark High Court Mabo ruling handed down in 1992, which repudiated the prevailing doctrine that Australia had been a terra nullius, and recognised the common law validity of the concept of native title, the Karajarri moved to gather evidence for an application to secure legal acknowledgement and endorsement of their claim to the traditional Karajarri lands. At the same time Western Agricultural Industries (WAI), a private development company, was eyeing the Karajarri lands for the potential their abundant waters offered for establishing a vast irrigation scheme for cotton production, though subsidiary cultivations of sugar cane, leucaena, exotic hardwoods, hemp, viticulture and freshwater aquafarming were also envisaged. The earlier Camballin Irrigation Scheme, implementing similar aims, turned the region immediately to the north of the Karajarri lands into a dustbowl, the toxic wash out of chemical fertilisers leading to drastic losses of local fish-eating species like pelicans and ibis, and the disappearance of kangaroos. The principle of earlier law remains in place: the waters themselves are commonwealth property, and the Indigenous peoples have only the right of usufruct.

The Karajarri Indigenous Protected Area was established in 2014, with the Karajarri Rangers practising fire-stick farming to encourage biodiversity in the area.

Alternative names

 Garadjara
 Garadjari, Karadjeri, Garadjeri
 Karadhari, Garad'are
 Kularupulu.(generic Nyangumarta exonym for their coastal branch and the coastal Karajarri)
 Laradjeri. (misprint).
 Minala. (minal means 'east', used of inland Karajarri social bands)
 Nadja. (coastal Karajarri)
 Nadjanadja
 Naudu. (inlander Karajarri)
 Nawudu. (Yawuru and Nyigina exonym)
 Nawurungainj. (Nyangumarta and Mangala term

Source:

Books about Karajarri life and lore
 Liz Thompson, The Danger Seed: Lirrinngkirn Dreaming a Story from Karajarri Country, Pearson Education Australia, 2011

Notes

Citations

Sources

Marrngu languages
Pilbara